Get That Girl may refer to:

Get That Girl (1932 film), an American film directed by George Crone
The British title of Caryl of the Mountains, a 1936 American film directed by Bernard B. Ray